Oregon State University's College of Science is a public academic institution operating as a member of Oregon State University, a public research university. The college of science consists of seven schools, offering nine undergraduate programs and supporting seven doctoral-granting programs and eight master's degree-granting programs. The college also supports the science discipline colleges and bachelor of science students by offering key undergraduate science courses required by their own curriculums. 

The college of science claims more than 3,400 students and a faculty of 184. The college is recognized nationally and globally as a center for excellence in scientific research and scholarship. Since its inception, the college has received more than $55 million in grant funding, developed more than 48 new technologies, and has been awarded 18 US patents since 2011.

History

The college was founded in 1932 as the Oregon State University School of Science. The creation of the college came as a result of a statewide reorganization of the Oregon State System of Higher Education in the same year. OSU paleontologist Earl L. Packard became the first dean that year. However, science coursework dates back much earlier to when the university first offered college-level courses. OSU's first college-level science classes were offered in 1868 and these first classes were General Science, Chemistry, and Geology of Oregon. In 1935 OSU awarded its first PhDs. Four of the three PhD recipients were college of science students: Herbert L. Jones in physics, Alfred Taylor in zoology and Karl Klemm in chemistry. The first woman to receive a PhD from OSU was Chung Kwai Lui. She received her degree from OSU in physics in 1941, after emigrating from China. Lui was later recruited into the top-secret Manhattan Project to help develop the first atomic bomb. During World War II, her expertise in purifying microscopic quantities of uranium was sought out by the Manhattan Project to purify larger, kilogram quantities. Her legacy lives on at OSU through the Wei Family Foundation Scholarships.

The school was later renamed to the Oregon State University College of Science in 1974.

Schools
Biochemistry and Biophysics
Integrative Biology
Chemistry
Mathematics
Microbiology
Physics
Statistics

Medical science programs (pre-med)
The college of science is closely aligned with top medical schools throughout the nation. On average, 60-to-70 percent of graduate applicants are accepted by their medical school of choice. This is an exceptionally high acceptance rate when compared to the 33-to-40 percent national average. Top majors at OSU for the pre-med program include: 
Biochemistry and Biophysics, Biochemistry and Molecular Biology, BioHealth Sciences (Ecampus), Biology, Chemistry and Microbiology. 
A range of special programs in health-related fields are also offered through the college to help students meet entrance requirements for professional schools in clinical laboratory science, dentistry, medicine, optometry, pharmacy, physical therapy, physician assistant, podiatry and veterinary medicine.

Measure 5
In 1990, Oregon voters passed the historic property-tax reducing Ballot Measure 5. Passage of the new law dramatically changed Oregon’s property taxes, greatly reduced funding for many K-12 schools, and helped to eliminate a popular program at the Oregon State University College of Science. Following passage of the measure, the college of science was asked by university administrators to find one program to cut to help meet the projected budget cuts. Reluctantly, college administrators chose to eliminate the general science department in 1991 and 1992 due to the department's broad curriculum. The university's general fund appropriations fell from $117 million in fiscal 1992/93 to $101.2 million for the 1993/94 fiscal year.

General science classes are still offered through the college curriculum, but only as a series of optional courses or discipline electives.

Notable alumni
Stacy Allison, first American woman to reach the summit of Mount Everest
Frits Bolkestein, retired Dutch politician and businessman who served as Leader of the People's Party for Freedom and Democracy (VVD) from 1990 to 1998 and European Commissioner for Internal Market from 1999 until 2004.
Peggy Cherng, co-founder and co-CEO of Panda Express, America's second richest self-made woman born outside the United States. 
Charity Dean, epidemiologist, assistant director of the California Department of Public Health in 2020 during the COVID-19 pandemic in the United States, co-founder and CEO of The Public Health Company.
Philip Emeagwali, internationally acclaimed computer scientist and 1989 Gordon Bell Prize for price-performance in high-performance computing applications.
Michael Gribskov, served as president of the International Society for Computational Biology, professor of biological sciences and computer science at Purdue University.
Wayne L. Hubbell, researcher in lens structure and function relationships in water-soluble proteins, Jules Stein Professor of Ophthalmology at UCLA.
Donald Kerr, wildlife biologist, founder of High Desert Museum.
Ann Kiessling, American biochemist and biophysicist, pioneer and discoverer of reverse transcriptase activity in normal human cells.
Roger Nichols, eight-time Grammy Award-winning recording engineer for many major musical artists of the 1970s-80s. 
Forrest Preston, owner, founder and CEO of Life Care Centers of America.
Leonard Shoen, founder of the U-Haul truck and trailer organization.
Ann Streissguth, academic and medical researcher known for her work on fetal alcohol syndrome.
Warren M. Washington, former chair of the National Science Board, current senior scientist at the National Center for Atmospheric Research (NCAR).
Marta Torres, professor and former student at OSU, known for biogeochemical impact research on the deep biosphere (ocean floor).
Michael Waterman, co-inventor of the Smith-Waterman algorithm used in DNA sequence alignment. Holds an Endowed Associates Chair in Biological Sciences, Mathematics and Computer Science at the University of Southern California. One of the foundational and lead figures in the field of computational biology.

Notable faculty
Corinne Alison Manogue, acclaimed physics educator/researcher, her research of the Casimir effect revealed a physically important electromagnetic sign error - now covered in standard textbooks.
George Poinar Jr. acclaimed entomologist, co-discovered DNA extraction method used for fossils embedded in amber. 
Heidi Schellman, ranked as one of the top female scientists in the world by the ranking group research.com.

List of deans 
Earl L. Packard (1932–1938)
Francois A. Gilfillan (1938–1962)
Vernon Cheldelin (1962–1965)
John Ward (dean of the Oregon State University College of Science)|John Ward (1966–1970)
Robert W. Krauss (1973–1980)
Thomas Sugihara (1981–1986)
Frederick M. Horne (1986–1999)
Sherman H. Bloomer (1999–2013)
Vincent T. Remcho (2013–2014)
Sastry Pantula (2014–2017)
Roy Haggerty (2017–2022)
Vrushali Bokil, interim, (2022–present)

References

External links 
 

Oregon State University
1932 establishments in Oregon
Science schools in Oregon